The 2011 European Youth Olympic Winter Festival was held in Liberec, Czech Republic, between 13 and 18 February 2011.

Sports

Participant nations

Azerbaijan, Israel, Malta, Portugal and San Marino (the remaining nations of the European Olympic Committees) did not compete.

Mascots
The mascot for this edition of European Youth Olympic Winter Festival is Rampich the icicle.

Venues
Venues used in this European Youth Olympic Winter Festival are:

Calendar

Medal table

References

External links
Official website

 
2011
2011 in Czech sport
2011 in multi-sport events
2011 in youth sport
February 2011 sports events in Europe
International sports competitions hosted by the Czech Republic
Multi-sport events in the Czech Republic
Sport in Liberec
Sports festivals in the Czech Republic
Youth sport in the Czech Republic